Abergasilus amplexus is a species of parasitic copepod endemic to euryhaline habitats in New Zealand. It is the only known species in the genus Abergasilus.

Description
This species is unique among ergasilids in that it only has three pairs of legs: the fourth and fifth pairs are reduced to single spines or are completely absent. The second antenna is very distinctive, hooks on the last and penultimate segments creating an obviously claw-like structure, more obvious in the female. The male is free-living, forming part of the plankton. Both sexes have an average length of 0.5 mm.

Hosts
The main host appears to be Anguilla australis: in Lake Ellesmere, infestation rates on this eel approach 100%, sometimes with over 100 parasites on the gills of a single fish. Other recorded host species include Anguilla dieffenbachii, Arripis trutta, Carassius auratus, Galaxias maculatus, Perca fluviatilis, Pseudophycis bachus, Retropinna retropinna, Rhombosolea leporina, Rhombosolea plebeia and Rhombosolea retiaria.

References

Poecilostomatoida
Monotypic crustacean genera
Freshwater crustaceans of New Zealand
Endemic fauna of New Zealand
Animal parasites of fish
Endemic crustaceans of New Zealand